Amberg-Sulzbach is a Landkreis (district) in Bavaria, Germany. It surrounds but does not include the city of Amberg. It is bounded by (from the north and clockwise) the districts of Neustadt an der Waldnaab, Schwandorf, Neumarkt, Nürnberger Land and Bayreuth.

History 
The history is linked with the history of the Upper Palatinate and the city of Amberg.

The district was established in 1972 by merging the former district of Amberg and the district-free city of Sulzbach-Rosenberg (the latter one lost its status as a district-free city in this administrative reform).

Geography 
The district is located in the geographical centre of Bavaria, 40 km east of Nuremberg. The main axis of the region is the Vils River (an affluent of the Naab) crossing the district from north to south. West of the river the land rises to the Franconian Jura, while there are gentle hills on the eastern side in the angle between Naab and Vils. The district is mainly covered by forests, especially in its western half.

Coat of arms 

The coat of arms displays:
 The Palatine Lion, which was the heraldic animal of the Upper Palatinate
 The lilies, which were a symbol of the counts of Sulzbach
 The mining tools, in order to remind of the mining history of the Upper Palatinate

Towns and municipalities

References

External links 

  (German)
Tourist information (German, French; English and Czech versions in process)

 
Districts of Bavaria